Emmanuel Sanchez (born August 11, 1990) is an American mixed martial artist currently competing in Bellator's Featherweight division. A professional competitor since 2011, Sanchez has also formerly competed for the Resurrection Fighting Alliance.

Background
Born and raised in a lower-middle-class family of Mexican immigrants, Sanchez wrestled as a kid but did not continue to the high school level in the sport. He became interested in MMA and Brazilian jiu-jitsu while attending high school. After a successful amateur career, Sanchez began his professional career in 2011, starting his professional career at 4–0.

Mixed martial arts career

Early career
Sanchez began his professional MMA career in November 2011. He compiled a record of 8–1 before signing with Bellator MMA.
During this time, Sanchez mainly competed in the lightweight division, before moving down to featherweight. He also competed once as a welterweight, in which he suffered his first professional loss against current UFC competitor Lewis Gonzalez.

Bellator MMA
Sanchez made his promotional debut against Stephen Banaszak at Bellator 128 on October 10, 2014. He won the fight via rear-naked choke submission at 2:18 in the first round.

In his second fight for the promotion, Sanchez faced Alejandro Villalobos at Bellator 135 on March 27, 2015. He won the back-and-forth fight via unanimous decision.

Stepping in for an injured Goiti Yamauchi, Sanchez faced former Bellator featherweight champion Pat Curran at Bellator 139 on June 26, 2015. He lost the fight via unanimous decision.

Sanchez next faced Henry Corrales at Bellator 143 on September 25, 2015.  He won the fight via split decision.

In his highest profile fight to date, Sanchez faced UFC veteran Justin Lawrence on November 6, 2015 at Bellator 145. He won the back-and-forth fight via split decision.

As the last fight of his prevailing contract, Sanchez next faced Daniel Pineda on the main card at Bellator 149 on February 19, 2016. He won the fight by split decision.

As the first fight of his new, multi-year contract with Bellator, Sanchez faced Daniel Weichel at Bellator 159 on July 22, 2016. He lost via split decision.

Sanchez returned the following January and faced Georgi Karakhanyan at Bellator 170. He won the fight via majority decision. One point was taken from Sanchez in the second round due to two illegal knee strikes.

Sanchez faced former Bellator bantamweight champion Marcos Galvao, who moved up to the featherweight division, at Bellator 175 on March 31, 2017. He won the fight via unanimous decision.

Sanchez faced Daniel Straus at Bellator 184 on October 6, 2017. He won the fight via triangle choke submission in the third round.

Sanchez faced Sam Sicilia at Bellator 198 on April 28, 2018. He won the fight by submission due to an arm triangle from the back position in the 1st round.

Sanchez faced Bellator Featherweight Champion Patrício Freire at Bellator 209 on November 16, 2018. He lost the fight by unanimous decision.

Sanchez faced Georgi Karakhanyan at Bellator 218 on March 22, 2019. He won the bout via unanimous decision.

Bellator Featherweight World Grand Prix
Sanchez next faced prospect Tywan Claxton in the opening round of the Bellator Featherweight World Grand Prix on September 7, 2019 at Bellator 226. He won the fight via submission in the second round.

In the quarterfinals, Sanchez was initially expected to face Daniel Weichel in a rematch in February 2020. However, the date got pushed back and they were next expected to face at Bellator 241 on March 13, 2020. Eventually the whole event was cancelled due to the prevailing COVID-19 pandemic. The bout was rescheduled and took place at Bellator 252 on November 12. Sanchez won the bout via unanimous decision.

In the semifinals, Sanchez faced Patrício Freire for the Bellator Featherweight World Championship at Bellator 255 on April 2. This was a rematch of their November 2018 bout which saw Freire win by unanimous decision. He lost the fight via technical submission in round one.

Post Grand Prix 
Sanchez faced Mads Burnell at Bellator 263 on July 31, 2021. He lost the very close bout via unanimous decision.

Sanchez faced Jeremy Kennedy on December 3, 2021 at Bellator 272. He lost the bout via unanimous decision.

Sanchez faced Yancy Medeiros on April 23, 2022 at Bellator 279. Sanchez lost the bout via unanimous decision.

Championships and accomplishments

Mixed martial arts
Bellator MMA
Tied (with Patrício Freire) for second most submission victories in Bellator Featherweight division (four)

Mixed martial arts record

|-
|Loss
|align=center|20–8
| Yancy Medeiros
|Decision (unanimous)
| Bellator 279
| 
| align=center|3
| align=center|5:00
| Honolulu, Hawaii, United States
| 
|-
|Loss
|align=center|20–7
|Jeremy Kennedy
|Decision (unanimous)
|Bellator 272
|
|align=center|3
|align=center|5:00
|Uncasville, Connecticut, United States
|
|-
|Loss
|align=center|20–6
|Mads Burnell
|Decision (unanimous)
|Bellator 263
|
|align=center|3
|align=center|5:00
|Los Angeles, California, United States
|
|-
|Loss
|align=center|20–5
|Patrício Pitbull
|Technical Submission (guillotine choke)
|Bellator 255
|
|align=center|1
|align=center|3:35
|Uncasville, Connecticut, United States
|
|-
|Win
|align=center|20–4
|Daniel Weichel
|Decision (unanimous)
|Bellator 252
|
|align=center|5
|align=center|5:00
|Uncasville, Connecticut, United States 
|
|-
|Win
|align=center|19–4
|Tywan Claxton
|Submission (triangle choke)
|Bellator 226
|
|align=center|2
|align=center|4:11
|San Jose, California, United States 
|
|-
|Win
|align=center|18–4
|Georgi Karakhanyan
|Decision (unanimous)
|Bellator 218
|
|align=center|3
|align=center|5:00
|Thackerville, Oklahoma, United States
|
|-
|Loss
|align=center|17–4
|Patrício Pitbull
|Decision (unanimous)
|Bellator 209
|
|align=center|5
|align=center|5:00
|Tel Aviv, Israel
|
|-
|Win
|align=center|17–3
|Sam Sicilia
|Submission (arm-triangle choke)
|Bellator 198
|
|align=center|1
|align=center|3:52
|Rosemont, Illinois, United States
| 
|-
|Win
|align=center|16–3
|Daniel Straus
|Submission (triangle choke)
|Bellator 184
|
|align=center|3
|align=center|1:56
|Thackerville, Oklahoma, United States
|
|-
|Win
|align=center| 15–3
|Marcos Galvão
|Decision (unanimous)
|Bellator 175
|
|align=center| 3
|align=center| 5:00
|Rosemont, Illinois, United States
|
|-
|Win
|align=center|14–3
|Georgi Karakhanyan
|Decision (majority)
|Bellator 170
|
|align=center|3
|align=center|5:00
|Inglewood, California, United States
|
|-
|Loss
|align=center|13–3
|Daniel Weichel
|Decision (split)
|Bellator 159
|
|align=center|3
|align=center|5:00
|Mulvane, Kansas, United States
|
|-
| Win
|align=center|13–2
|Daniel Pineda
|Decision (split)
|Bellator 149
|
|align=center|3
|align=center|5:00
|Houston, Texas, United States
| 
|-
| Win
|align=center|12–2
|Justin Lawrence
|Decision (split)
|Bellator 145
|
|align=center|3
|align=center|5:00
|St. Louis, Missouri, United States
|
|-
| Win
|align=center|11–2
|Henry Corrales
|Decision (split)
|Bellator 143
|
|align=center|3
|align=center|5:00
|Hidalgo, Texas, United States
|
|-
|Loss
|align=center|10–2
|Pat Curran
|Decision (unanimous)
|Bellator 139
|
|align=center|3
|align=center|5:00
|Mulvane, Kansas, United States
|
|-
|Win
|align=center|10–1
|Alejandro Villalobos
|Decision (unanimous)
|Bellator 135
|
|align=center|3
|align=center|5:00
|Thackerville, Oklahoma, United States
|
|-
|Win
|align=center|9–1
|Stephen Banaszak
|Submission (rear-naked choke)
|Bellator 128
|
|align=center|1
|align=center|2:18
|Thackerville, Oklahoma, United States
|
|-
|Win
|align=center|8–1
|Brady Hovermale
|Submission (armbar)
|NAFC: Summer Slam
|
|align=center|1
|align=center|1:53
|Milwaukee, Wisconsin, United States
|
|-
|Win
|align=center|7–1
|Jose Pacheco
|Submission (triangle choke)
|NAFC: Mega Brawl
|
|align=center|1
|align=center|2:44
|Milwaukee, Wisconsin, United States
|
|-
|Win
|align=center|6–1
|Gustavo Rodriguez
|KO (punch)
|NAFC: Super Brawl 2
|
|align=center|1
|align=center|3:53
|Milwaukee, Wisconsin, United States
|
|-
|Win
|align=center|5–1
|Michael McBride
|Decision (unanimous)
|RFA 10: Rhodes vs. Jouban
|
|align=center|3
|align=center|5:00
|Des Moines, Iowa, United States
|
|-
|Loss
|align=center|4–1
|Lewis Gonzalez
|Decision (unanimous)
|WFC 5: Andrews vs. Griffin
|
|align=center|3
|align=center|5:00
|Sacramento, California, United States
|
|-
|Win
|align=center|4–0
|Brandon Dudley
|Decision (split)
|CageSport 21
|
|align=center|3
|align=center|5:00
|Fife, Washington, United States
|
|-
|Win
|align=center|3–0
|Travis Johnson
|Submission (rear-naked choke)
|UCS: Caged Combat 6
|
|align=center|2
|align=center|2:51
|Grand Ronde, Oregon, United States
|
|-
|Win
|align=center|2–0
|Juan Carlos Rodriguez
|Submission (rear-naked choke)
|Northwest Fighting: Young Guns 1
|
|align=center|1
|align=center|3:24
|Usk, Washington, United States
|
|-
|Win
|align=center|1–0
|Matt Church
|Decision (unanimous)
|Fight Night: Round 17: Clash at the College
|
|align=center|3
|align=center|5:00
|Mount Vernon, Washington, United States
|

See also
 List of current Bellator fighters
 List of male mixed martial artists

References

Living people
1990 births
American male mixed martial artists
Featherweight mixed martial artists
American mixed martial artists of Mexican descent
Sportspeople from Milwaukee
Mixed martial artists from Wisconsin
Mixed martial artists utilizing karate
Mixed martial artists utilizing Brazilian jiu-jitsu
American male karateka
American practitioners of Brazilian jiu-jitsu
People awarded a black belt in Brazilian jiu-jitsu